Estrella TV is an American Spanish language broadcast television television network owned by Liberman Broadcasting which was launched on September 29, 2009. , the network currently has eight owned-and-operated stations, and current affiliation agreements with 47 other television stations.

This article is a listing of current Estrella TV affiliates in the continental United States (including subchannel and low-power affiliates, and satellite stations), which are subcategorized into separate tables for its owned-and-operated and affiliated stations. The stations listed are also arranged alphabetically by state, and based on the station's city of license and followed in parentheses by the Designated Market Area if it differs from the city of license. There are links to articles on each of the broadcast stations, describing their histories, technical information (such as broadcast frequencies) and any local programming. The station's advertised channel number follows the call letters. In most cases, this is their virtual channel (PSIP) number.

The article also includes a list of its former affiliate stations, which is also based on the station's city of license or market, and denotes the years in which the station served as an Estrella TV affiliate as well as the current status of the corresponding channel that carried the network.

Current stations

Owned-and-operated stations

Affiliate stations

Current affiliates

Former affiliates

References

External links
 

Estrella TV